Roque Ditro (17 August 1936 – 9 April 2001) was an Argentine footballer. He played in three matches for the Argentina national football team in 1963. He was also part of Argentina's squad for the 1963 South American Championship.

References

External links
 

1936 births
2001 deaths
Argentine footballers
Argentina international footballers
Place of birth missing
Association football defenders
Argentinos Juniors footballers
Club Atlético River Plate footballers
Boca Juniors footballers
Deportivo Español footballers